In enzymology, a phenylacetyl-CoA dehydrogenase is an enzyme that catalyzes the chemical reaction

phenylacetyl-CoA + H2O + 2 quinone  phenylglyoxylyl-CoA + 2 quinol

The 3 substrates of this enzyme are phenylacetyl-CoA, H2O, and quinone, whereas its two products are phenylglyoxylyl-CoA and quinol.

This enzyme belongs to the family of oxidoreductases, specifically those acting on CH or CH2 groups with a quinone or similar compound as acceptor. The systematic name of this enzyme class is phenylacetyl-CoA:quinone oxidoreductase. This enzyme is also called phenylacetyl-CoA:acceptor oxidoreductase.

References

 
 

EC 1.17.5
Enzymes of unknown structure